Holy Trinity Church, Coventry, is a parish church of the Church of England in Coventry City Centre, West Midlands, England.

Above the chancel arch is an impressive Doom wall-painting.

History

The church dates from the 12th century and is the only Medieval church in Coventry that is still complete.

The church was restored in 1665–1668, and the tower was recased in 1826 by Thomas Rickman. The east end was rebuilt in 1786 and the west front by Richard Charles Hussey in 1843.

The inside of the church was restored by George Gilbert Scott in 1854.

Doom painting

The doom painting was painted above the tower arch in 1430s. It was discovered in 1831, covered by a lime wash, and was then restored and varnished over by David Gee. In the years following, the varnish darkened and hid the painting from view again. In 1995, conservation and restoration work was begun and the painting was revealed in 2004.

Organ

The church had a pipe organ which had evolved over a long period of time with work by many builders, the last by Henry Willis and Sons. A specification of the organ can be found on the National Pipe Organ Register.

History

1526: This is the earliest recorded organ, built by John Howe and John Clynmowe of London for £30. In the late 16th century it was dismantled as the Puritan clergy at Holy Trinity disapproved of organs.
1631: Samuel Buggs (Vicar), "procured" a replacement instrument.
1640s: Puritans back in charge, organ sold for £30.
1732: The German Thomas Swarbrick, who also supplied a new organ for Coventry Cathedral (Old Cathedral), built one for Holy Trinity for £600. It was placed upon a gallery erected for it across the Nave and had 2 manuals.
1829: Swell and pedal added.
1855–1861: As part of the George Gilbert Scott restoration of the church, a new organ chamber was built in the westernmost bay of the south chancel aisle. This instrument of 3 manuals plus pedals, was built by Forster and Andrews for £800.
1900: Rebuilt by W. Hill & Sons with some of the old work incorporated; 4 manuals.
1923: Electric blowing chest added.
1933: J. Charles Lee of Coventry added pneumatic pistons.
1961: Rebuilt for £12,200 by the firm of Henry Willis, the organ contained 59 speaking stops, each with 61 pipes, along with 30 couplers and 3 tremolos.
2007: Organ was dismantled, due to it being beyond repair. A funding appeal has been launched for a new organ, which will cost approximately £600,000.

List of organists

List of assistant organists
 Sullivan D.T. Mortimer ???? – ca.1900 (afterwards organist of St. Mary's Church, Atherstone)
 Norman Coke-Jephcott 1909–1911
 Harold Carpenter  c.1950–60
 Peter Bourton c.1954–64. Afterwards Organist at St Marks, Bilton, Rugby.

Notable clergy

 Rob Budd, curate 2013–2016
 Tony Burford, curate 
 Hennie Johnston, curate 2003–2007
 James Hill, curate 2011–2013
 Anthony Francis Williams, curate 1950–1962
 Roy Windmill, curate 1967–1971

List of Vicars
Dates listed are of appointment, unless otherwise noted.

Ralph de Sove, (no dates known)
Henry de Harenhale, 1298
John de Holland, 1334
John Greneburgh, 1346
Egidius Fillilod, 1349
William Swet, 1380
John de Amcotes, 1381
John Brideston, (no dates known)
William Gamell, 1383
Nicholas Crosloy, 1421
John Meneley, 1443
Thomas Bowde, (no dates known)
Thomas Orton, 1508
Richard Collett, (no dates known)
Nicholas Darington, 1527
Roger Capp, (no dates known)
William Benet, 1546
George Brooche, 1554
George Cheston, 1568
Anthony Fletcher, 1576
Humphrey Fenne, 1577
Richard Eaton, 1590
Thomas Cooper, 1604
Samuel Gibson, 1610
John Staresmore, 1618
Samuel Buggs, 1626
Henry Carpenter, 1633
Joseph Brown, 1636
Robert Proctor, 1638
John Bryan, 1644
Nathaniel Wanley, 1662
Samuel Barton, 1680
Jonathan Kimberley, 1681
Samuel Kimberley, 1712
John Macklin, 1734
Nathaniel Gerard, 1752
Joseph Rann, 1773
John Davies, 1811
Walter Farquhar Hook, 1828–1837 (afterwards Vicar of Leeds Parish Church)
John Howells, 1837
William Drake, 1857
Alfred William Wilson, 1864
Francis M. Beaumont, 1872–1912
R. Basil Littlewood, 1912
Acland F. O'N. Williams, 1929
Graham W. Clitheroe, 1931
Lawrence Jackson, 1965–1973 (later Provost of Blackburn)
Nigel Douglas Blayney Abbott, 1973–1980 (later Provost of Oban)
Graham Dow, 1981–1992 (later Bishop of Carlisle)
David Andrew Urquhart, 1992–2000 (later Bishop of Birmingham)
Gordon Keith Sinclair, 2001–2007 (later Bishop of Birkenhead)
David Mayhew, 2009–2016
Graeme Anderson, 2017-2021
Richard Hibbert, from 2022

Stained glass windows

See also

Grade I listed buildings in Coventry

References 

Grade I listed churches in the West Midlands (county)
Churches in Coventry
George Gilbert Scott buildings
Tourist attractions in Coventry
Church of England church buildings in the West Midlands (county)